Delhi Institute of Technology & Management (DITM) is a private college affiliated with Guru Gobind Singh Indraprastha University and located in Ganaur, Haryana. Admission to DITM in engineering degree programmes is through the Common Entrance Test (CET) conducted by Guru Gobind Singh Indraprastha University. DITM is recognised as private unaided institution by AICTE. The institute runs different courses in engineering, business studies and computer education.

See also
Education in India
Literacy in India
List of institutions of higher education in Haryana

References

External links

Universities and colleges in Haryana
Colleges of the Guru Gobind Singh Indraprastha University
Business schools in Haryana
Engineering colleges in Haryana